Gordon Jones (born 1 February 1889; date of death unknown) was an English footballer who played for Bedlington St Andrews, Melrose, Birkenhead, Bolton Wanderers, Tottenham Hotspur, Chester City, South Liverpool, Hurst, Crichtons Athletic, Wrexham, Connah's Quay, Flint Town United.

Football career 
Jones played for non–League clubs Bedlington St Andrews, Melrose and Birkenhead before joining Bolton Wanderers. In 1912 the inside right joined Tottenham Hotspur where he played a total of seven matches. After leaving White Hart Lane, Jones made appearances for Chester City, South Liverpool, Hurst, Crichtons Athletic before signing for Wrexham in 1921. He went on to play for Connahs Quay and finally Flint Town.

Personal life
Jones served as a private in the British Armed Forces during the First World War.

References 

1889 births
Sportspeople from Birkenhead
English footballers
English Football League players
Bolton Wanderers F.C. players
Tottenham Hotspur F.C. players
Chester City F.C. players
South Liverpool F.C. players
Wrexham A.F.C. players
Connah's Quay F.C. players
Ashton United F.C. players
Flint Town United F.C. players
Year of death missing
Clapton Orient F.C. wartime guest players
Association football inside forwards
Glenavon F.C. players
British military personnel of World War I
Place of death missing
Military personnel from Birkenhead